Korehi (also Romanized as Koreh’ī and Korehee) is a village in Khesht Rural District, Khesht District, Kazerun County, Fars Province, Iran. At the 2006 census, its population was 270, in 62 families.

References 

Populated places in Kazerun County